Jean-Pierre Balligand (born 30 May 1950) was a member of the National Assembly of France, representing the 3rd constituency of the Aisne department from 1981 to 2012. He is a member of the Socialist Party (Parti Socialiste) and worked in association with the SRC parliamentary group.

References

1950 births
Living people
People from Aisne
Politicians from Hauts-de-France
Socialist Party (France) politicians
Deputies of the 7th National Assembly of the French Fifth Republic
Deputies of the 8th National Assembly of the French Fifth Republic
Deputies of the 9th National Assembly of the French Fifth Republic
Deputies of the 10th National Assembly of the French Fifth Republic
Deputies of the 11th National Assembly of the French Fifth Republic
Deputies of the 12th National Assembly of the French Fifth Republic
Deputies of the 13th National Assembly of the French Fifth Republic
Chevaliers of the Légion d'honneur